The Trade Union Advisory Co-ordinating Council (TUACC) was a national trade union federation in South Africa.

The General Factory Workers' Benefit Fund was established in 1972, as part of the Durban Moment.  From 1973, it began launching trade unions, organised loosely from January 1974 as the "Trade Union Advisory Co-ordinating Council".  The unions were organised on a factory basis, and aimed to be highly democratic, and open to all workers, regardless of race.  They grew rapidly at first, and although they lost members later in the decade, they remained active.

The federation's affiliates were:

In 1974, the Industrial Aid Society was founded in the Witwatersrand, and this worked closely with TUACC, providing advisory services.  In 1979, the majority of TUACC affiliates led the formation of the Federation of South African Trade Unions, and TUACC was dissolved.

References

National trade union centres of South Africa
Trade unions established in 1974
Trade unions disestablished in 1979